Fort Sullivan may refer to:

United States

Florida
 Fort Sullivan (see List of forts in Florida)

Maine
 Fort Sullivan (Maine), near Eastport
 Fort Sullivan (1775-1866), in Kittery, Maine opposite Portsmouth, New Hampshire, now Portsmouth Naval Prison 

Pennsylvania
 Fort Sullivan from the Sullivan Expedition of the Revolutionary War, near Athens

South Carolina
 Fort Sullivan (South Carolina) (see Fort Moultrie), on Sullivan's Island